George Leech (6 December 1921 – 17 June 2012) was a British film actor and stunt performer who was notable for his work on eleven James Bond films.

Biography

Leech was born in London and left school at 14. He was a boxer who won the ABA National Championships when he was 15 as a welterweight and he joined the Royal Navy in 1943.

Film career

His first job in movies was performing a stunt involving falling down steps doubling for James Mason in Odd Man Out (1947).
He was notable for his contributions to James Bond films from 1962 to 1985 as a stunt performer and in small acting roles (usually as a henchman) including: Dr. No (1962), Goldfinger (1964), Thunderball (1965), On Her Majesty's Secret Service (1969), where he was promoted to stunt arranger when Bob Simmons was working on another film,  For Your Eyes Only (1981), and A View to a Kill (1985). He also worked on The Guns of Navarone, Chitty Chitty Bang Bang, Kelly's Heroes, The Eagle Has Landed and Revenge of the Pink Panther.

Personal life
He married in 1952. One of his two daughters Wendy Leech became one of the first female stunt performers and married the stuntman Vic Armstrong. Leech died at age 90 in Cardiff.

Filmography

References

External links
 

English stunt performers
1921 births
2012 deaths
Royal Navy personnel of World War II